Podolian District was a district of the Civil Administration of the Lands of Volhynia and Podolian Front that was under the control of Second Polish Republic. It existed from 17 January 1920 until summer 1920 when it was conquered by the Ukrainian SSR during the Polish–Soviet War. Its seat was located in Kamianets-Podilskyi.

History 
It was formed on 17 January 1920 with the establishment of the Civil Administration of the Eastern Lands, a civil authority controlled by the Second Polish Republic during the Polish–Soviet War. Its seat was located in Kamianets-Podilskyi. The region was governed by the Chief of District.

Upon its creation, it was subdivided into counties: Kamieniec, Płoskirów, Uszyca and Latyczów. On 15 May 1920, Starokonstantynów County was transferred from Volhynian to Podolian District.

The territory was conquered in the summer of 1920 by the Ukrainian SSR.

Subdivisions

Counties 

Latyczów County
Kamieniec County
Płoskirów County
Starokonstantynów County (from 15 May 1920)
Uszyca County

Notes

References 

States and territories established in 1920
States and territories disestablished in 1920
1920 establishments in Poland
1920 disestablishments in Poland
Districts of the civil administrations of the Second Polish Republic
History of Podolia